Sir Darnley Arthur Alexander, QC, CBE, GCON, SAN (28 January 1920 – 10 February 1989) was a Nigerian jurist and Chief Justice of Nigeria from 1975 to 1979.

Alexander was born in Castries, Saint Lucia on 28 January 1920. He attended University of London and obtained a Bachelor of Law degree in 1942. He served as a crown counsel and legal draftsman in Jamaica and as a magistrate in Turks and Caicos Islands. He came to Nigeria in 1957 on the invitation of the premier of the Western Region, Obafemi Awolowo who had appealed to the Colonial Office in London to help source a legal draftsman; Alexander then served the region in various capacities. He was Legal Draftsman, Western Region, Nigeria from 1957-1969 and was acting Director of Public Prosecutions in 1958. 

In 1960, he was appointed the Solicitor General and Permanent Secretary of the regional Ministry of Justice and in 1963, he was made Queen's Counsel. In 1964, he was appointed a judge in the Lagos High Court and later in 1969, he was appointed Chief Justice of the South Eastern State now Cross River and Akwa Ibom states. He was appointed Chief Justice in 1975 over senior members of the Court. As a judge, he was appointed by Dennis Osadebay to serve as the commissioner of enquiry into the Owegbe secret cult, he was also chairman of the Tribunal of Inquiry into Examination Leakages.

In the 1974 Birthday Honours, he was knighted, having previously been appointed CBE.

References

1920 births
1989 deaths
Alumni of the University of London
Commanders of the Order of the British Empire
Nigerian jurists
Nigerian knights
Nigerian Queen's Counsel
Saint Lucian emigrants to Nigeria
People from Castries Quarter
20th-century Nigerian lawyers
Chief justices of Nigeria
Lagos State judges
Nigerian Knights Bachelor
Lawyers awarded knighthoods
Supreme Court of Nigeria justices
Senior Advocates of Nigeria
Saint Lucian expatriates in the United Kingdom